The Host (lit. "Monster") is a 2006 South Korean monster film directed by Bong Joon-ho and starring Song Kang-ho, Byun Hee-bong, Park Hae-il, Bae Doona and Go Ah-sung. The film concerns a monster kidnapping a man's daughter, and his attempts to rescue her. According to the director, his inspiration came from a local article about a deformed fish with an S-shaped spine caught in the Han River.

Following the success of the director's work Memories of Murder, The Host was highly anticipated. It was released on a record number of screens in its home country on July 27, 2006. By the end of its run on November 8, 13 million tickets had been sold, making it (at the time) the highest-grossing South Korean film of all time. The film was released on a limited basis in the United States on March 9, 2007, and on DVD, Blu-ray, and HD DVD formats on July 24, 2007. It won several awards including Best Film at the Asian Film Awards and at the Blue Dragon Film Awards.

Plot
In 2000, an American military pathologist orders his Korean assistant to dump 200 bottles of formaldehyde down a drain leading into the Han River. Over the next several years, there are sightings of a strange amphibious creature in the waterway, and the fish in the river die off.

In 2006, a slow-witted man named Park Gang-du runs a small snack bar in a park near the river with his father, Hee-bong. Other family members are Gang-du's daughter, Hyun-seo; his sister Nam-joo, a national medalist archer; and his brother, Nam-il, an alcoholic college graduate and former political activist.

A huge creature emerges from the Han River and begins attacking people. Gang-du tries to grab his daughter from the crowd and run, but he realizes he has grabbed the wrong person's hand and sees the creature snatching away Hyun-seo and diving back into the river. After a mass funeral for the victims, government representatives and the American military arrive and quarantine people who had contact with the creature, including Gang-du and his family. It is announced that the creature is the host of a deadly, unknown virus.

Gang-du receives a phone call from Hyun-seo. She explains that she is trapped in the sewers with the creature, but her phone stops working. Gang-du and his family escape the hospital and purchase supplies from gangsters in order to search for Hyun-seo. Two homeless boys, Se-jin and Se-joo, after raiding Hee-bong's snack bar for food, are attacked and swallowed by the creature. It returns to its sleeping area in the sewer and regurgitates them, but only Se-joo is alive. Hyun-seo helps Se-joo hide inside a drain pipe where the creature cannot reach them.

The Parks encounter the creature and shoot at it until they run out of ammunition. The creature kills Hee-bong due to Gang-du miscalculating the remaining shells in his shotgun when he gives it to Hee-bong. Gang-du is captured by the Army and Nam-il and Nam-joo become separated from each other. Nam-il meets an old friend, Fat Guevara, at an office building to ask for help and learns the government has placed a bounty on his family. Unbeknownst to Nam-il, Fat Guevara has contacted the government so he can claim the bounty, but Nam-il is able to escape after obtaining Hyun-seo's location. Gang-du overhears an American scientist say that there is no virus; it was made up to distract people from the creature's origin. They decided to lobotomize Gang-du to silence him.

When she thinks the creature is sleeping, Hyun-seo tries to escape from its lair using a rope she has made from old clothes. The creature awakes and swallows Hyun-seo and Se-joo. Gang-du succeeds in escaping from where he is being held by taking a nurse hostage. Nam-il meets a homeless man who helps him. The government announces a plan to release a toxic chemical called Agent Yellow into the river to attempt to kill the creature. Gang-du finds the creature and sees Hyun-seo's arm dangling out of its mouth. He chases it to the location where Agent Yellow is to be released, coming across Nam-joo along the way. The creature attacks the large crowd that has assembled to protest the chemical dump. Agent Yellow is released, which stuns the creature. Gang-du pulls Hyun-seo out of its mouth, but she is dead, though she is still clutching Se-joo, who is unconscious, but alive. Gang-du, enraged at his daughter's death, attacks the creature, aided by Nam-il, Nam-joo, and the homeless man. They set it on fire and Gang-du impales it with a pole, finally killing it. As they mourn for Hyun-seo, Gang-du revives Se-joo.

Some time later, it is seen that Gang-du has inherited his father's snack bar and adopted Se-joo. While watching the river, he hears a noise and picks up a double-barrel shotgun to investigate, but finds nothing. He and Se-joo have a meal together, ignoring a news broadcast stating that the aftermath of the incident was due to misinformation.

Cast
 Song Kang-ho as Park Gang-du, a clumsy misfit vendor in his father's shop, who often falls asleep. He is often berated by his family members, and his laziness was caused by lack of protein as a child. 
 Byun Hee-bong as Park Hee-bong, the father of Gang-du, Nam-il, Nam-joo, and grandfather of Hyun-Seo. He runs the shop near the Han River with Gang-du. 
 Park Hae-il as Park Nam-il, an unemployed university graduate and former political activist. 
 Bae Doona as Park Nam-joo, a national medalist archer, who attempts to use her skills on the monster.
 Go Ah-sung as Park Hyun-seo, the pre-teen daughter of Gang-du who is embarrassed by her family, especially her father. According to her grandfather, her birth was an "accident," and her mother ran away afterwards. She is kidnapped by the Gwoemul, prompting the family to search for her.
 Oh Dal-su as the voice of the Gwoemul, a giant creature mutated by chemicals dumped into the Han River. The Gwoemul attacks any humans that come into its path.
 Lee Jae-eung as Se-jin, the older homeless brother who attempts to steal food from the Park snack shop.
 Lee Dong-ho as Se-joo, the younger homeless brother who follows Se-jin and later befriends Hyun-seo.
 Yoon Je-moon as the homeless man, who helps Nam-il create weapons to battle the monster.
 Yim Pil-sung as Nam-il's senior, "Fat Guevara"
 Kim Roi-ha as Yellow 1 (at the funeral)
 Park No-sik as the inquiry officer
 Go Soo-hee as the hostage nurse
 David Joseph Anselmo as Donald White, a U.S. sergeant residing in South Korea with his girlfriend, who helps Gang-du fight the monster when it first emerges from the Han River.
 Scott Wilson as a U.S. Military doctor, who orders his Korean assistant to dump chemicals into the Han River, creating the Gwoemul.
 Paul Lazar as an American doctor, who speaks with Gang-du about finding his daughter, and reveals a truth.
 Brian Lee as a young Korean doctor, assistant to a U.S. Military doctor, who is ordered to dump chemicals into the Han River, and is later seen translating for Gang-du.

Production

Background
The film was the third feature-length film directed by Bong Joon-ho.

Filming
Some of the filming took place in the real sewers near the Han River, rather than on a set. The stars and crew were inoculated against tetanus by the medical officer. During filming, the crew had to deal with the effects of changes in weather and ambient temperature. This including the sewage water freezing in cold temperatures, so that it had to be broken up and melted; and during hot and windy periods, the water evaporated and the silt turned to dust, which blew around in the breeze and into the faces of the crew.

Special effects
The director had to work around the budget-imposed restrictions, especially when it came to special effects. The creature was designed by Chin Wei-chen, the modeling was done by New Zealand-based Weta Workshop and the animatronics were by John Cox's creature Workshop.
The CGI for the film was done by The Orphanage, which also did some of the visual effects in The Day After Tomorrow.

The monster was designed with some specific parameters in mind. According to the director himself the inspiration came from a local article about a deformed fish with an S-shaped spine caught in the Han River.
Therefore, the director's wishes were for it to look like an actual mutated fish-like creature, rather than have a more fantastical design. In the opening scenes of the film, two fishermen presumably encounter the creature whilst it is still small enough to fit in one of their cups; suggestive of its humble, more realistic origins. The monster also exhibits frontal limbs similar to amphibians' legs. This element of its design seems to have been more a choice of functionality on the designers' part as the monster needed to be able to run and perform certain acrobatic movements during the film. For a genre film monster, the creature's size is rather small, only about the size of a truck. Also unlike in many other monster-themed films, the creature is fully visible from early on in the film, sometimes for large stretches of time and even in broad daylight, which earned the film some critical praise.

Political background
The film was in part inspired by an incident in 2000, in which a Korean mortician working for the U.S. military in Seoul reported that he was ordered to dump a large amount of formaldehyde down the drain. In addition to its environmental concerns, this caused some antagonism toward the United States. The American military stationed in South Korea is portrayed as uncaring about the effects their activities have on the locals. The chemical agent used by the American military to combat the monster in the end, named "Agent Yellow" in a thinly-veiled reference to Agent Orange, was also used to satirical effect. The director, Bong Joon-ho, commented on the issue: "It's a stretch to simplify The Host as an anti-American film, but there is certainly a metaphor and political commentary about the U.S."

Because of its themes, which can be seen as critical of the United States, the film was lauded by North Korean authorities, a rarity for a South Korean blockbuster film.

The film features a satirical portrayal of the South Korean government as bureaucratic, inept, and essentially uncaring. Korean youth protesters are featured satirically in the film, in a mixed way, partially heroic and partially self-righteous and oblivious. According to Bong Joon-ho, the Park Nam-il character is a deliberate anachronism, a reference to South Korea's troubled political history, which involved violent protest. "When you look in terms of this character, it's sort of like the feeling of time going backwards. [...] You could say that he is the image of the college protester back ten years ago; it doesn't exist in the present day."

Release

The film was released theatrically in Australia on August 17, 2006. During the first half of September 2006, it premiered in Japan, Singapore, Taiwan, Thailand and Hong Kong. It received a theatrical release in the United Kingdom on November 10, 2006. This was its first official release outside of film festivals, and outside Asia and Australia. Its American release was March 9, 2007. It was also released in France, Ireland, Sweden, Germany, and Spain, amongst other countries.

The Host received screenings on several film festivals. In addition to its opening in Cannes, among the most prominent were the Toronto, Tokyo and New York film festivals. The film swept Korea's Blue Dragon Awards : The Host received five awards, Go Ah-sung took Best New Actress and  Byun Hee-bong was awarded as Best Supporting Actor.

Reception

Box office
The Host premiered at the Cannes Film Festival on May 21, 2006 and was released nationally in South Korea on July 27, 2006. Having been heavily hyped and featuring one of the most popular leading actors in the country, Song Kang-ho, the film was released on a record number of screens and made the South Korean record books with its box office performance during its opening weekend. The 2.63 million admissions and  box office revenue easily beat the previous records set by Typhoon. The film reached six million viewers on August 6, 2006. In early September the film became South Korea's all time box office leader, selling more than 12.3 million tickets in just over a month in a country of 48.5 million. By the end of its run on November 8, the viewing figures came in at 13,019,740.

Critical reception
The French film magazine Cahiers du cinéma ranked the film as 3rd place in its list of best films of the year 2006 and 4th for the 2000–2009 decade. The Japanese film magazine Kinema Junpo selected it as one of the top 10 best foreign films of the year 2006. (Flags of Our Fathers won the best foreign film of the year 2006.)

With a limited American release starting March 11, 2007, The Host received critical acclaim. It holds a 93% approval rating on Rotten Tomatoes, based on 151 reviews with an average rating of 7.7/10. The website's critical consensus states, "As populace pleasing as it is intellectually satisfying, The Host combines scares, laughs, and satire into a riveting, monster movie." In addition, it was ranked one of the top films of 2007 on Metacritic with a score of 85 out of 100 based on 35 reviews, indicating "universal acclaim". Manohla Dargis of The New York Times wrote "The Host is a loopy, feverishly imaginative genre hybrid about the demons that haunt us from without and within." In 2009, the filmmaker Quentin Tarantino included it in his list of top 20 films released since 1992 (the year he became a director). The film was also listed at #81 on Empire'''s list of The 100 Best Films of World Cinema.

Home media release
The region-2 UK release of the film was released on March 5, 2007, while the region-1 US DVD was released on July 24, 2007, in both single-disc and a two-disc collector's edition in DVD, HD-DVD and Blu-ray Disc formats.

Video game
Twitch Film announced on November 3, 2009 that a video game was planned, to be released as a multi-platform first-person shooter. As of April 2021, no game had been released and is assumed to be vaporware.

Sequel
In June 2007, it was announced that a 3D film—alternately referred to as a sequel or prequel in news reports—was in progress, with a different director. An FX demo reel debuted at the Tokyo International Film Festival in 2010 and the projected release date of summer 2012 was announced. However, as of 2022, there have been no further updates on the project, and its current status is unknown.

Remake
In November 2008, it was announced that Universal Studios would be remaking The Host with Gore Verbinski producing, Mark Poirier writing the script, and first-time director Fredrik Bond directing the film. The film was set for a 2011 release. However, the production has remained in so-called "development hell".

Top ten lists
The film appeared on several critics' top ten lists of the best films of 2007.

 2nd - Ella Taylor, LA Weekly (tied with Manufactured Landscapes)
 2nd - V.A. Musetto, New York Post 4th - Dana Stevens, Slate 5th - Marc Mohan, The Oregonian 5th - Mike Russell, The Oregonian 7th - Desson Thomson, The Washington Post 9th - Wesley Morris, The Boston Globe''

Awards and nominations

References

Further reading
  - master's degree thesis

External links 
  
  
 
 
 
 
 
 The Host: Creepie Korean Creatures at Animation World Network
 The Language Barrier and the Beast at The Culturatti
 Podcast: Bong Joon-Ho Discusses The Host with The Korea Society

2006 films
2006 horror films
2000s monster movies
2006 science fiction films
South Korean horror films
South Korean science fiction horror films
Japanese horror films
Japanese science fiction horror films
2000s science fiction horror films
Giant monster films
Films set in Seoul
Films shot in Seoul
Films directed by Bong Joon-ho
Films with screenplays by Bong Joon-ho
Kaiju films
Asian Film Award for Best Film winners
Best Picture Blue Dragon Film Award winners
Chungeorahm Films films
Showbox films
2000s Korean-language films
2000s English-language films
Films set in 2000
Films set in 2002
Films set in 2006
Films about dysfunctional families
2006 multilingual films
South Korean multilingual films
Japanese multilingual films
English-language South Korean films
English-language Japanese films
2000s Japanese films
2000s South Korean films